Clyde Wayne Lee (born March 14, 1944) is an American former professional basketball player who had his most success as an All-American center at Vanderbilt University, where the two-time Southeastern Conference Player of the Year was among the most heralded players in school history. He was the No. 3 overall pick in the 1965 NBA draft and a one-time NBA All-Star, playing ten seasons in the league.

College career
A lanky 6'10" forward/center with blond beach boy looks, Lee was born on March 14, 1944, in Nashville, Tennessee. He attended David Lipscomb Campus School (now Lipscomb Academy) then went on to star at Vanderbilt under coach Roy Skinner for three seasons (1963-66). While there, he was active in the Fellowship for Christian Athletes. 

Known for his rebounding skills and scoring prowess around the basket, Lee made an immediate impact as a sophomore, when he averaged 18.8 points and 15.6 rebounds per game. While Lee considered himself to be a rebounder first and foremost, he added a drive to the basket and mid-range jump shot to his game in the next season and quickly blossomed into one of the elite big men in the country. The junior led the SEC in scoring and rebounding and shattered several school records along he way. Overall, he averaged 22.0 points and 15.5 rebounds per contest and set school marks for most points (631) and field goals (239) in one season. He also grabbed the most rebounds (27) in one game by a Commodores player in their history. 

After Lee went off for 41 points against Kentucky, the most ever by a Vanderbilt player against its conference rival, Wildcats coach Adolph Rupp was moved to say, "We'd like to have him. He's a fine one."

The Commodores reached the NCAA Mideast Regional Finals, where top-ranked Michigan outlasted them, 87-85, but not before Lee outplayed the Wolverines' Bill Buntin in a highly anticipated matchup in the middle. He had 28 points and 20 rebounds in the loss. The Commodores finished the season with a 24-4 record and their first Southeast Conference championship with a 15-1 mark, after which Lee was selected for the first of two consecutive SEC Player of the Year Awards.

In his senior season (1965–66), Lee continued his dominance the paint area. Despite an impressive 22-4 record, which included a pair of losses against No. 2 Kentucky, the Commodores did not qualify for the NCAA Tournament. He averaged 22.7 points and 15.8 rebounds per game, earning All-American honors and another SEC Player of the Year Award. Sportswriter Howell Pesier called him as "the greatest player in Vanderbilt history".

Lee averaged 21.4 points and 15.5 rebounds over his 79-game college career, leading Vanderbilt to 65 victories over three seasons.

NBA career
After four years at Vanderbilt, Lee was selected by the San Francisco Warriors with the No. 3 overall pick of the 1966 NBA draft behind Cazzie Russell, No. 1 to the New York Knicks and Dave Bing, Detroit Pistons .

In 1966-1967, Lee and the Warriors made the NBA Finals, where they were defeated 4-2 by Wilt Chamberlain and the Philadelphia 76ers. Lee averaged 6.4 points and 7.2 rebounds in the series.

Lee appeared in the 1968 NBA All-Star Game.

Lee was the player to be named later upon being sent to the Atlanta Hawks on October 4, 1974 to complete a transaction from February 2, 1970 in which the Warriors acquired the NBA contractual rights to Zelmo Beaty in exchange for its first-round pick in the 1970 NBA draft which eventually became Pete Maravich who was selected third overall. After only nine games with the Hawks, he was traded along with a third-round pick in the 1975 NBA draft (39th overall–Jimmie Baker) to the Philadelphia 76ers for Tom Van Arsdale on November 8, 1974. He then concluded his career in Philadelphia, playing his final two seasons.

A strong rebounder and defender, Lee said, “It's what you might consider the dirty work, but that's the way I'm able to play in the league.” He added, “I don't feel that I'm a good shooter, but then again I don't feel I have to score. I don't look for the shot. I try to get an offensive rebound or keep the ball alive. This is my value to the team."

In ten (1966–1976) National Basketball Association seasons, spent with the Warriors (1966-1974), Atlanta Hawks (1974), and Philadelphia 76ers (1974-1976), Lee scored 5,733 points (7.7) with 7,626 (10.3) rebounds in 742 games.

Personal
Lee has taught yoga classes at Vanderbilt, after discovering yoga to alleviate pain from basketball injuries.

He has served as a color commentator for radio broadcasts of Vanderbilt men's basketball games.

Honors
In 1966, Vanderbilt designated "Clyde Lee Day" on the occasion of Lee's last career home game.

Lee was inducted into the Tennessee Sports Hall of Fame in 1995.

in 2008, Lee was named to the Vanderbilt Athletics Hall of Fame as part of its inaugural class.

NBA career statistics

Regular season

Playoffs

Notes

External links

1944 births
Living people
All-American college men's basketball players
Amateur Athletic Union men's basketball players
American members of the Churches of Christ
American men's basketball players
Atlanta Hawks players
Basketball players from Nashville, Tennessee
Centers (basketball)
Golden State Warriors players
National Basketball Association All-Stars
Philadelphia 76ers players
Power forwards (basketball)
San Francisco Warriors draft picks
San Francisco Warriors players
Vanderbilt Commodores men's basketball players